Adam Nightingale (born December 19, 1979) is an American former ice hockey player and the head coach of the Michigan State Spartans men's ice hockey team.

Playing career
Nightingale began his collegiate career at Lake Superior State where he recorded six goals and nine assists in 51 games in two seasons. He sat out the 2002–03 season after transferring to Michigan State. He was a two-year assistant captain for the Spartans and recorded 12 goals and 10 assists in 67 games. Following his collegiate career, on March 23, 2005, he signed a contract with the Greenville Grrrowl of the ECHL. He went on to play two seasons for the Grrrowl and two seasons for the Charlotte Checkers where he recorded 10 goals, 17 assists and 171 penalty minutes in 78 games from 2004 to 2008.

Coaching career
Following his playing career, Nightingale was named head coach of the Shattuck-Saint Mary's midget AA team in 2008, a position he held for two seasons.

On July 15, 2010, he was named the Director of Hockey Operations for Michigan State. He served as the Director of Hockey Operations for the Spartans for four years before being named the head coach at Shattuck-Saint Mary's under-14 AAA team from 2014 to 2016. He won a national title with the team in 2016.

On July 15, 2016, he was named a video coach for the Buffalo Sabres during the 2016–17 season. On May 3, 2017, he was named video coach for the Detroit Red Wings during the 2017–18 season. In August 2019, he was promoted to assistant coach for the 2019–20 season.

On August 27, 2020, he was named the head coach for the USA Hockey National Team Development Program under-17 team.

On May 3, 2022, he was named the head coach for Michigan State.

International
Nightingale served as the video coordinator for the United States at the 2015 World Junior Ice Hockey Championships and the 2017, 2018 and 2019 IIHF World Championship.

On May 10, 2021, he was named an assistant coach for the United States men's national ice hockey team at the 2021 IIHF World Championship and won a bronze medal.

On April 6, 2022, he was named the head coach for the United States men's national under-18 ice hockey team at the 2022 IIHF World U18 Championships and won a silver medal.

Personal life
Nightingale's younger brother, Jared, is a former professional ice hockey player. They both played college ice hockey together at Michigan State. His older brother, Jason, is assistant director of Amateur Scouting for the Buffalo Sabres.

References

External links
 

1979 births
Living people
American men's ice hockey right wingers
Buffalo Sabres coaches
Charlotte Checkers (1993–2010) players
Detroit Red Wings coaches
Greenville Grrrowl players
Ice hockey players from Michigan
Lake Superior State Lakers men's ice hockey players
Michigan State Spartans men's ice hockey players
People from Cheboygan, Michigan